Allan John Montgomery (2 September 1958 – 15 March 2021) was an Australian rules footballer who played for the Perth Football Club in the West Australian Football League and the Carlton Football Club in the Victorian Football League (VFL).

Notes

External links 

Allan Montgomery's playing statistics from WAFL Footy Facts
Allan Montgomery's profile at Blueseum

1958 births
Carlton Football Club players
Perth Football Club players
Australian rules footballers from Western Australia

2021 deaths